Liz  Moore (born May 25, 1983) is an American author. After a brief time as a musician in New York City, which inspired her first novel, The Words of Every Song (2007), Moore shifted her focus to writing. She subsequently published the novels Heft in 2012 and The Unseen World in 2016. She received the 2015 Rome Prize in Literature from the American Academy in Rome, and her novel Heft was longlisted for the International IMPAC Dublin Literary Award. Moore grew up in Framingham, Massachusetts and received a bachelor's degree from Barnard College. She received a Masters of Fine Arts in creative writing from Hunter College in 2009. She teaches in the MFA program at Temple University. Moore lives in Philadelphia with her husband, daughter, and son.

Bibliography

Novels 
 The Words of Every Song (2007)
 Heft (2012)
 The Unseen World (2016)
 Long Bright River (2020)

References 

1983 births
Living people
21st-century American novelists
American women novelists
Barnard College alumni
Hunter College alumni
21st-century American women writers